Aleksandr Vyacheslavovich Chistyakov (born 16 February 1980) is a former Russian professional football player.

Club career
He played 5 seasons in the Russian Football National League for FC Lokomotiv Chita, FC Zvezda Irkutsk and FC Nizhny Novgorod.

References

External links
 

1980 births
Footballers from Yaroslavl
Living people
Russian footballers
Association football defenders
FC Baltika Kaliningrad players
FC Zvezda Irkutsk players
FC Nizhny Novgorod (2007) players
FC Chita players